St Thomas’ Church, South Wigston is a Grade II* listed parish church in the Church of England in South Wigston, Leicestershire.

History
The foundation stone was laid on 26 July 1892 by Thomas Ingram and it was consecrated on 2 February 1893 by Rt. Revd. Mandell Creighton the Bishop of Peterborough.

It was built in brick with a Westmorland slate roof by Henry Bland to the designs of the architect Stockdale Harrison at a cost of £3,600.

The tower was added in 1901.

Parish status
The church is in a joint benefice with
All Saints' Church, Wigston Magna
St Wistan's Church, Wigston Magna

Organ
The church contains a pipe organ dating from 1895 by Stephen Taylor of Leicester. It was paid for by Thomas Ingram at a cost of £500 and dedicated on 26 September 1875 by Bishop Mitchinson. A specification of the organ can be found on the National Pipe Organ Register.

The Bells
A peal of eight bells was cast in 1901 by John Taylor & Co. On 26 December 1904, seven ringers set a new world record when they rang a peal of 17,184 double Norwich Court Bob, breaking the record set in 1898 at Kidlington by the Oxford Guild. One of the ringers broke down after 10 hour 35 minutes.

References

Church of England church buildings in Leicestershire
Grade II* listed buildings in Leicestershire
Churches completed in 1893